Vladimir Eminger (born 3 April 1992) is a Czech professional ice hockey defenceman. He is currently playing with the Fischtown Pinguins of the Deutsche Eishockey Liga (DEL).

Eminger made his SM-liiga debut playing with Oulun Kärpät during the 2012–13 SM-liiga season.

References

External links

1992 births
Living people
Czech ice hockey defencemen
Fischtown Pinguins players
HC Karlovy Vary players
BK Mladá Boleslav players
HC Sparta Praha players
Oulun Kärpät players
People from Litvínov
Sportspeople from the Ústí nad Labem Region
Czech expatriate ice hockey players in Finland
Czech expatriate ice hockey players in Germany